Governor Nelson may refer to:

Ben Nelson (born 1941), 37th Governor of Nebraska
Gaylord Nelson (1916–2005), 35th Governor of Wisconsin
Knute Nelson (1843–1923), 12th Governor of Minnesota
Thomas Nelson Jr. (1738–1789), 4th Governor of Virginia, son of William Nelson.
William Nelson (governor) (1711–1772), Governor of colonial Virginia from 1770 to 1771